Austrophlugis is a genus of katydids belonging to the family Tettigoniidae.

The species of this genus are found in Australia.

Species:

Austrophlugis debaari 
Austrophlugis kumbumbana 
Austrophlugis kununurra 
Austrophlugis malidupa 
Austrophlugis manya 
Austrophlugis orumbera 
Austrophlugis quaringa

References

Tettigoniidae